Gurnak may refer to:
 Gurnak, Iranshahr
 Gurnak, Sarbaz